South Hall is the oldest building on the campus of the University of California, Berkeley, built in 1873 in the Napoleon III style. It is the only remaining building of the original campus. South Hall was originally the counterpart of North Hall, which no longer exists, but was located where the Bancroft Library currently stands.

The first physics laboratory in the United States was hosted in South Hall in 1879. It also has been home to the College of Agriculture, a business school, and a temporary museum for the state geological survey.  It currently houses the UC Berkeley School of Information. When Wheeler Hall was planned, the entrance of South Hall was removed from the west side and added on the east side entrance. The original wooden porch was replaced in 1997 with glass fiber reinforced concrete.

Campus tour guides often point out a small stone bear, sculpted by Michael H. Casey, in the architecture of South Hall, on the balcony railing above the entrance, in the third circle from the left, claiming it is the smallest bear statue on campus.

The four-story building is located southwest of Sather Tower.

References

External links

 UC Berkeley's School of Information: About South Hall

Buildings and structures in Berkeley, California
University of California, Berkeley buildings
University and college buildings on the National Register of Historic Places in California
National Register of Historic Places in Berkeley, California
Second Empire architecture in California
University and college administration buildings in the United States
1873 establishments in California